Huberto Pérez de la Ossa Rodríguez (born Albacete, 1897– died Salamanca, 31 August 1983) was a Spanish writer and theatre director. His published work includes El ancla de Jasón (1921), La lámpara del dolor (1923), El opio del ensueño (1924), La Santa Duquesa (1924) (Premio Nacional de Literatura), La casa de los masones (1927) and El aprendiz de ángel (1935). After the Spanish Civil War, he moved on to stage direction. Between 1940 and 1952, he collaborated with Luis Escobar Kirkpatrick at the Teatro María Guerrero in Madrid. He also translated foreign plays into Spanish, including several works by Dostoyevsky.

See also
 Roberto Molina (writer) (Alcaraz, 1883–1958) 
 Artemio Precioso (writer) (Hellín, 1891–1945) 
 Mariano Tomás (Hellín, 1891–1957)

References

Spanish theatre directors
Spanish translators
20th-century Spanish writers
20th-century Spanish male writers
20th-century translators
People from Albacete
1897 births
1983 deaths